Mikel Koliqi (September 29, 1900 – January 28, 1997) was an Albanian cardinal and priest of the Roman Catholic Church. He was born and died in Shkodër (Shkodra), Albania. At the Time of his death he was the Oldest Member of the College of Cardinals.

Life
Mikel Koliqi studied philosophy and Roman Catholic theology in Milan, Italy. He was ordained as a priest on May 30, 1931, and worked afterwards in the diocese of Shkodra. In 1936, he became Vicar-General of the diocese. He created the Cathedral School, became publisher of a Catholic weekly newspaper and wrote stage plays.

After 1945, he spent 38 years in prison at hard labour as a political prisoner of the communist regime. He was accused of listening to foreign radio stations and (something) Catholic Youth. Mikel Koliqi survived 38 years of imprisonment in Enver Hoxha's jails to become, at the age of 92, a member of the highest body in the Roman Catholic Church, the College of Cardinals. The first Albanian to be raised to the Sacred College, he was apparently chosen as the oldest of the 30 or so Catholic priests to have survived the Communist persecutions. "Imprisoned and prevented for long years in the exercise of his priestly mission," Pope John Paul wrote in the wake of his death, "he, as a solid oaktree, never became intimidated, becoming a shining example of trust in Divine Providence as well as constant fidelity to the See of Peter."
Born in Shkodra in 1902, Koliqi was educated by the Jesuits who, recognizing his intelligence and potential, sent him for study at the Aricci College in Brescia in Italy. Among his schoolmates was the future Pope John XXIII. He went on to study engineering at Milan University before transferring to the theology faculty. He was ordained priest in Shkodra in 1931 and was appointed a curate at the cathedral parish. In 1936 he became parish priest at the cathedral, as well as vicar general of the Shkodra archdiocese. As a young priest he was involved in youth work and Catholic journalism. He was also the founder of Catholic Action in Albania, as well as writing three operas that are credited with being the foundation of an Albanian operatic tradition.

He was arrested in February 1945 as the new Communist dictatorship tightened its grip on religious organisations. He spent the next five years in prison, mostly in solitary confinement. Two priests arrested with him were shot.

Pope John Paul II named him a cardinal deacon in 1994 for the church Ognissanti in via Appia Nuova.

Koliqi lived out his last years with his niece and her family in a small flat near Shkodra cathedral. Always ready to welcome visitors, despite his frailty, he would recount his prison experiences without bitterness. He was ever eager to show the photographs of the consistory, proudly pointing out his nephews and nieces who were present to share what he called the "highlight" of his life.

He is buried in Shkodër's cathedral.

Albanian cardinals
20th-century Roman Catholic theologians
1900 births
1997 deaths
Cardinals created by Pope John Paul II
People from Shkodër
20th-century Albanian Roman Catholic priests